The Hero is a 2004 Angolan-Portuguese-French film directed by Zézé Gamboa. It was filmed on location in Angola and won the World Dramatic Competition Grand Prize at the 2005 Sundance Film Festival.

Plot 
The Hero follows the intersecting lives of four individuals living in Luanda in the wake of the Angolan Civil War: Vitório, a war veteran crippled by a landmine in search of a job; Manu, a ten year old boy searching for his father four years after his disappearance; Joana, a second-grade teacher who mentors Manu; and Judite/Maria Barbara, a prostitute who begins a romantic relationship with Vitório.

Reception 
In addition to its Sundance award, The Hero received awards from over twenty-five other film festivals.

References

External links 
 

2004 films
French drama films
Angolan drama films
2004 drama films
Films set in Angola
Portuguese drama films
2000s Portuguese-language films
2000s French films